Mahesh Bhupathi and Leander Paes were the defending champions.  They successfully defended their title, defeating Olivier Delaître and Max Mirnyi in the final 6–7, 6–3, 6–2.

Seeds

  Todd Woodbridge /  Mark Woodforde (quarterfinals)
  Mahesh Bhupathi /  Leander Paes (champions)
  Jeff Salzenstein /  Jonathan Stark (first round)
  Olivier Delaître /  Max Mirnyi (final)

Draw

Draw

External links
Draw

1998 Gold Flake Open
Maharashtra Open